The 2015 Erewash Borough Council election took place on 7 May 2015 to elect members of Erewash Borough Council in England. This was on the same day as other local elections.

Erewash Borough Council (Summary of Overall Results)

Erewash Borough Council - Results by Ward

Awsworth Road

Breaston

Cotmanhay

Derby Road East

Derby Road West

Draycott and Risley

Hallam Fields

Kirk Hallam and Stanton By Dale

Larklands

Little Eaton and Stanley

Little Hallam

Long Eaton Central

Nottingham Road

Ockbrook and Borrowash

Sandiacre

Sawley

Shipley View

West Hallam and Dale Abbey

Wilsthorpe

References

2015 English local elections
May 2015 events in the United Kingdom
2015
2010s in Derbyshire